Abralia astrolineata is a species of enoploteuthid cephalopod that occurs in the waters around the Kermadec Islands in New Zealand. It is fairly large for this genus, growing up to 100 mm in mantle length.

References

Abralia
Molluscs described in 1914
Taxa named by Samuel Stillman Berry